"Born to Be Wild" is a song written by Mars Bonfire and first performed by the band Steppenwolf. The song is often invoked in both popular and counter culture to denote a biker appearance or attitude. It is most notably featured in the 1969 film Easy Rider. It is sometimes described as the first heavy metal song, and the second-verse lyric "heavy metal thunder" marks the first use of this term in rock music (although not as a description of a musical style but rather a motorcycle).

Composition
"Born to Be Wild" was written by Mars Bonfire as a ballad. Bonfire was previously a member of the Sparrows, the predecessor band to Steppenwolf, and his brother was Steppenwolf's drummer. Although he initially offered the song to other bands — The Human Expression, for one — "Born to Be Wild" was first recorded by Steppenwolf in a sped-up and rearranged version that AllMusic's Hal Horowitz described as "a roaring anthem of turbo-charged riff rock" and "a timeless radio classic as well as a slice of '60s revolt that at once defines Steppenwolf's sound and provided them with their shot at AM immortality".

Release and reception
"Born to Be Wild" was the band's third single off their 1968 debut album Steppenwolf and became their most successful single, reaching No.2 on the Billboard Hot100 singles charts. It was kept from the No.1 spot by "People Got to Be Free" by the Rascals. In 2004, Rolling Stone magazine placed "Born to Be Wild" at No.129 on the 500 Greatest Songs of All Time list. Also in 2004, it finished at No.29 on AFI's 100 Years...100 Songs survey of top tunes in American cinema. In 2009, it was named the 53rd best hard rock song of all time by VH1 (It ranked 40th in the 100 Greatest Songs of Rock and Roll by VH1 nine years earlier.). In 2018, the song was inducted into the Rock and Roll Hall of Fame in a new category for singles.

Charts

Weekly charts

Year-end charts

Certifications

Cover versions

In 1985, the song was covered by Australian band Rose Tattoo. Their version peaked at No. 25 in Australia. In 2002, it was covered by Kim Wilde and released as a non-album single. Her cover reached No. 84 in Germany and No. 71 in Switzerland. Tanja Dexters also covered the song in 2002. Her version peaked at No. 21 in Belgium.

Other artists that covered this song include Hinder, Etta James, Link Wray, Slade, The Cult, INXS, Ozzy Osbourne with Miss Piggy, Bruce Springsteen, Slayer, Blue Öyster Cult, Status Quo, Fanfare Ciocărlia, Krokus, Wilson Pickett, La Renga, and Jess Greenberg.

Charts

Rose Tattoo version

Kim Wilde version

Tanja Dexters version

See also
List of number-one singles of 1968 (Canada)

References

1968 songs
1968 singles
1985 singles
2002 singles
Bruce Springsteen songs
Dunhill Records singles
Edel AG singles
Epic Records singles
Grammy Hall of Fame Award recipients
Hinder songs
Kim Wilde songs
Ozzy Osbourne songs
RCA Records singles
RPM Top Singles number-one singles
Slade songs
Steppenwolf (band) songs
Wilson Pickett songs